Owen Wright (born 16 January 1990) is an Australian professional surfer on the World Surf League (formerly the Association of Surfing Professionals) Men's Championship Tour. His sister, Tyler Wright, is also a competitor on the World Surf League Championship Tour.

In the 2020 Tokyo Olympics Wright Owen Wright battled Brazil, past injury and rough seas to take Australia's first surfing Olympic bronze medal. Just being named in the Tokyo 2020 Olympic Team was one of the great comebacks in Australian sport after his bad experience in Hawaii in late 2015. Australia at the 2020 Summer Olympics details the results in depth.

On 16 June 2015 Wright became the first surfer to post two perfect scores in a single event, during Round 5 and the final of the Fiji Pro.

Personal life
Wright was born on 16 January 1990 and grew up at Culburra Beach on the south coast of New South Wales. He has no cousins but he has 5 siblings who all surf. His sister Tyler Wright is a two-time Women's World Champion, winning the Women's Championship Tour in 2016 and 2017. Their brother Mikey competes on the Men's Championship Tour as well.

As a junior, along with his sister Tyler and fellow south coast local World Tour competitor Sally Fitzgibbons, he competed in GromSearch, a national series development program that gives under 16 year olds competition experience against top senior surfers.

Wright is married to Australian singer Kita Alexander. They have a son born in December 2016 and a daughter born in January 2021.

Professional career
Wright won the Australian title in 2007 and qualified for the Champions Tour in 2009.
In his 2010 debut season he ranked seventh, and was named Rookie of the Year. In 2011 he won his first Champions Tour event at Long Island, New York receiving surfing’s largest-ever prize of $300,000.

During the 2015 tour, Wright won his second title at the Fiji Pro event scoring two perfect 10-point rides. This was the first time such a score had been achieved at the one event and he was only the fifth surfer to ever achieve a perfect 20. The win took him to third place in the 2015 season's standings.

In December, in the lead up to the Pipeline Masters, the final event of the 2015 calendar, he had a wipe out at Banzai Pipeline in Hawaii. Wright suffered a traumatic brain injury and had to relearn how to talk, walk and then surf again. He recorded his recovery steps on social media. Owen is now championing the use of safety helmets while surfing to protect surfers from wipeout injuries.

After spending 2016 recovering, Wright was granted a wildcard entry to the 2017 World Surf League season.

In his comeback, Wright won the Champions Tour calendar's opening event, the Quiksilver Pro  at Snapper Rocks on Australia's Gold Coast. It was his third WSL title.

In between WSL events, Wright trained with Surfing Australia's national squad preparing for the debut of surfing at the Tokyo 2020 Olympic Games where he won a bronze medal.

Career victories

References

External links

1990 births
Living people
People from the South Coast (New South Wales)
People from the Northern Rivers
Australian surfers
World Surf League surfers
Sportsmen from New South Wales
Olympic surfers of Australia
Surfers at the 2020 Summer Olympics
Olympic bronze medalists for Australia
Medalists at the 2020 Summer Olympics
Olympic medalists in surfing